Galadima Football Club formally known as Galadima Football Academy is a Nigerian football club based in Abuja, Nigeria. The team currently compete in the third division of Nigerian football league system, the Nigeria Nationwide League. They play their home matches at the Area 3 Artificial Turf Football Field, Abuja.

History
The club was originally called Galadima Football Academy prior to its formation in 2002. The Academy was renamed to Galadima Football Club. With increasing interest from numerous foreign scouts, three players were sponsored abroad to play in Hungary after the Academy won the 7th Dreamland Embassy of Hungary Cup organized by the Embassy of Hungary in Abuja.

Management

Notable players 
 Ibrahim Saleh Yahaya, currently plays for FC Zimbru Chisinau in Moldova
 Sani Suleiman Abacha, Currently plays for Budapest Honvéd FC in Hungry 
 Anas Abubakar Galadima, currently plays for SFC Kalinkovo in Slovakia 
 Abubakar Idris Kani, currently plays for US Monastir in Tunisia

References

Football clubs in Nigeria
Sport in Abuja
2002 establishments in Nigeria
Sports clubs in Nigeria
Association football clubs established in 2002